Ten Stories is the fifth studio album by American indie rock band mewithoutYou. The record was produced by Daniel Smith and mixed by Brad Wood.  The album's track listing was published by Alternative Press's website in March 2012.

The album focuses on ten stories that make up the larger story of the whole album of a traveling circus and the train crash it suffered in late 19th-century Montana. The inspiration comes from a book read in a class that lead singer and lyricist Aaron Weiss took while attending school during the band's hiatus.

On May 8, 2012, the record became available for streaming on Spotify. The album was released May 15, 2012 with pre-orders starting April 17, 2012.

The largest pre-order bundle on their online store is $40 and includes a 2XLP on colored 150g vinyl, 4th side vinyl etching, custom inner sleeves, a 28-page lyric booklet with 11 original paintings by Vasily Kafanov, 11x17 Poster, 13-song bonus CD with alternate album cover, instant digital download on street date, exclusive b-sides 7" single Other Stories:, an 8-page lyric booklet, two more original paintings by Vasily Kafanov, and foreword by the band's drummer Rick Mazzotta.

Track listing
Music by mewithoutYou, lyrics by Aaron Weiss.

References

2012 albums
MewithoutYou albums